This is a listing of the horses that finished in either first, second, or third place and the number of starters in the Fire Plug Stakes, an American open stakes race for horses four years old and older at six furlongs on dirt held at Laurel Park Racecourse in Baltimore, Maryland.  (List 1993–present)

References

External links
 Laurel Park website

Lists of horse racing results
Laurel Park Racecourse